Trachys may refer to:

Trachys (plant), a genus of grass
Trachys (beetle), a genus of beetles